The Hooghly-class of fuel barge is a series of service watercraft being built by Hooghly Dock & Port Engineers Ltd, Kolkata (HDPEL) for the Indian Navy.

Description
Hooghly-class fuel barges are self-propelled auxiliary capable of replenishing LSHSD, AVCAT and other oils for ships in harbour, at anchorage and fuel depots at distant location. Each vessel in the class has a length of 67 meters with beam of 12.5 meters and depth of 4 meters. They have draught of 4 meters and have displacement of 1700 tonnes. They have a rated capacity to carry 1000 tonnes of fuel. They are able to operate up to sea state 4 and service up to sea state 6.
As per a contract order of INR 96.12 crores from Indian Navy, four 1000-ton fuel barges are to be constructed, with an option for two more barges.

Specifications
Length: 67.05 m
Beam extreme: 12.52 m
Depth: 5.5 m
Draught: 4 m
Displacement: 1700 tonnes

See also
INS Purak
INS Puran
INS Poshak

References

External links
SPS Naval Forces
Marine consultants

Auxiliary ships of the Indian Navy
Ships of the Indian Navy
Auxiliary barge classes